Saboten was an all-female post-punk Japanese band of the 1980s. The Tokyo-based band's experiments including works playing with the music of Erik Satie, and collaborations with Lol Coxhill.

Albums
Saboten 1981
Awake 1984

References

Japanese musical groups